Shkëlzen Doli (born August the 9th, 1971 in Elbasan, Albania, and grew up in Gjakova, Kosovo) is an Albanian violinist. In 1980, he began to play the violin. From 1987 to 1991, he studied at the music school in Novi Sad under Ewgenia Tschugueva.

In 1989 he won his first prize at the Yugoslavian youth music contest in Sarajevo. In 1992 he began his music studies at University of Music and Performing Arts in Vienna taking lessons from Dora Schwarzberg, Michael Frischenschlager and Josef Hell. A short time later, he became a substitute for the Vienna State Opera Orchestra. And now has been a member of the second violin section. Since 1995, he has played with the Vienna Philharmonic Orchestra.

By taking part in various Philharmonic chamber music ensembles, such as the “Toyota Master Players”, the “Vienna Virtuosen” or René Staar’s “Ensemble Wiener Collage”, Shkëlzen Doli successfully and fully established himself in Vienna’s musical life. Solo and ensemble tours have taken him to numerous European countries and to North America, Africa, Israel and Japan. Just recently he has become a founding member of the newly formed chamber music ensemble, “The Philharmonics”.

References

Albanian musicians
Living people
1971 births
People from Elbasan
Musicians from Gjakova
Albanian emigrants to Yugoslavia
21st-century violinists
Players of the Vienna Philharmonic